The 2002–03 Sheffield Shield season known as the Pura Cup was the 101st season of the Sheffield Shield, the domestic first-class cricket competition of Australia. New South Wales won the championship.

Table

Final

References

Sheffield Shield
Sheffield Shield
Sheffield Shield seasons